Eternal Oath is a Swedish symphonic/melodic death metal band, formed in 1991 in Stockholm, Sweden. In their 15-year existence, they released three albums, one demo, one EP and one compilation album. The group had been in the process of recording a fourth album, but ultimately disbanded in January 2007. In 2011, the band reunited and released a new album in 2013.

Two notable past members include Peter Nagy (former multi-instrumentalist for Mörk Gryning) and Ted Lundström (current Amon Amarth bassist).

History
Eternal Oath was formed in 1991 by Ted Jonsson (drums), Petri Tarvainen (guitar) and Joni Mäensivu (vocals). In February 1994, the band recorded a 3 song promotional tape which secured a deal with Rat Pack Records for one EP. In March 1995, So Silent was recorded. Financial problems with the company would delay the EP's release. The group subsequently broke their contract with the label and self-released the EP the following year financed by Nwrapped Media.

In March 1998, the band entered the studio to record their first album, Through The Eyes Of Hatred for Singapore-based label Pulverised Records. The album would be released in early 1999.

In the fall of 2001, the band entered Studio Fredman in Gothenburg, Sweden to record their second album, Righteous. Containing 10 tracks including a cover of Paradise Lost's "Eternal", the album received a wide response all over the world. Righteous was mixed and engineered by Fredrik Nordström, known for contribution to albums by In Flames, Arch Enemy, At The Gates and Dark Tranquillity.

A few months later, Pulverised Records went bankrupt, and in early 2004 the band signed with Sound Pollution/Black Lodge Records, who in turn purchased the entire Eternal Oath back catalog. In June of the same year, Eternal Oath returned to Studio Fredman once again to record their 3rd (and last) LP, Wither, which would be released March 29, 2005 through Black Lodge.

Breakup and reunion
After over 15 years of activity, the band dissolved in early 2007, with some previous members going on to form a new project, Faceshift, later in the year.

In 2011, the band announced that Eternal Oath was reforming after a 5-year absence. This came at the 20th anniversary of the band. The new lineup consists of four of the founding members, with Peter Nagy-Eklof and Petri Tarvainen on guitar, Ted Jonsson on drums and Joni Mäensivu on vocals. They also bolstered their lineup with two new members: Mika Kajanen on bass and Johan Adler on keyboards. Their fourth album, Ghostlands was released in 2013.

Style
While firmly rooted in Swedish melodic death metal, the band's direction has varied on each album, going from blues/folk music progressions similar to Opeth to symphonic experimentation like Hypocrisy. The band had also utilized female gothic metal vocals and traits of doom/death metal.

Discography

Studio albums
1999: Through The Eyes of Hatred (Pulverised Records)
2002: Righteous (Greater Art Records)
2005: Wither (Black Lodge Records)
2013: Ghostlands

EPs
1996: So Silent (NWrapped Media)

Demos
1991: Art of Darkness

Compilation
2006: Re-Released Hatred (So Silent and Through The Eyes Of Hatred on one CD) (Black Lodge Records)

Members
Joni Mäensivu - vocals
Ted Jonsson - drums
Peter Nagy - guitar
Petri Tarvainen - guitar
Mika Kajanen - bass guitar
Johan Adler - keyboards

Past members
Timo Hovinen - vocals
Peter Wendin - bass guitar
Stefan Norgren - drums (previously keyboards)
Pelle Almquist - keyboards
Ted Lundström - bass guitar (1991–1993)
Daniel Dziuba - guitar (1991–1993)
Martin Wiklander - bass guitar (1993–1996)

References

External links
Official MySpace page
Metal-Archives page

Musical groups established in 1991
Musical groups disestablished in 2007
Swedish melodic death metal musical groups
Swedish gothic metal musical groups
Swedish symphonic metal musical groups
1991 establishments in Sweden